Chris Rudd (born 17 December 1969) is an English former professional rugby league footballer who usually played as a . He played for Warrington (Heritage No. 883) at club level between 1988 and 1998, and also represented Cumbria and Great Britain Under-21's.

Career
Rudd started his career with amateur club Kells, and played against Leeds in the 1988 Challenge Cup. He signed for Warrington later that year, and spent ten years with the club, making 169 appearances between 1988 and 1998.

Rudd played for Cumbria in the 10–42 defeat against Australia during the 1990 Kangaroo tour. In 1991, he played twice for Great Britain under-21s against France.

References

1969 births
Living people
Cumbria rugby league team players
English rugby league players
Great Britain under-21 national rugby league team players
Place of birth missing (living people)
Rugby league centres
Rugby league fullbacks
Rugby league players from Cumbria
Rugby league wingers
Warrington Wolves players